Stoloteuthis is a small genus of bobtail squid in the family Sepiolidae and the subfamily Heteroteuthidinae with one species, Stoloteuthis leucoptera, which is found in the western and eastern Atlantic Ocean, the Mediterranean Sea, the Indian Ocean, the Antarctic Ocean and the southwestern Pacific Ocean. The other species, Stoloteuthis japonica. was described in 2011 from a type specimen collected off northeastern Honshu.

Species
Recognised species of Stoloteuthis:
 Stoloteuthis cthulhui Fernández-Álvarez, Sánchez & Villanueva, 2021
Stoloteuthis japonica Kubodera & Okutani, 2011
Stoloteuthis leucoptera (Verrill, 1878)
 Stoloteuthis maoria (Dell, 1959)
 Stoloteuthis weberi (Joubin, 1902)
Synonyms
 Stoloteuthis iris Berry, 1909: synonym of Iridoteuthis iris (Berry, 1909) (original combination)
 Stoloteuthis leucopterus (Verrill, 1878): synonym of Stoloteuthis leucoptera (Verrill, 1878) (Spelling variation)
 Stoloteuthis nipponensis Berry, 1911: synonym of Sepiolina nipponensis (Berry, 1911) (original combination)

References

External links
 Verrill A. E. (1880). The Cephalopods of the North-Eastern coast of America. Part II. The smaller Cephalopods, including the "squids" and the octopi, with other allied forms.. Transactions of the Connecticut Academy of Arts and Sciences 5: 259-446
 Vecchione, M. & Roper, C.F.E. (2014). Stoloteuthis Verrill, 1881. Version 21 January 2014
 Reid, A.L. (2021). Two new species of Iridoteuthis (Cephalopoda: Sepiolidae: Heteroteuthinae) from the southwest Pacific, with a redescription of Stoloteuthis maoria (Dell, 1959). Zootaxa. 5005(4): 503-537

Cephalopod genera
Bobtail squid
Bioluminescent molluscs